Tadjidine Ben Said Massounde (1933 in Anjouan – February 29, 2004) was a Comorian politician.

Biography 
Massounde served as Prime Minister from 27 March 1996 to 27 December 1996. After the death of President Mohamed Taki Abdoulkarim on 6 November 1998, he became interim President. His government was overthrown in a 30 April 1999 military coup led by Colonel Azali Assoumani.

References 

1933 births
2004 deaths
Presidents of the Comoros
Leaders ousted by a coup
Prime Ministers of the Comoros
Finance ministers of the Comoros